Gustavo Petricioli Iturbide (19 August 1928 – 9 October 1998) was a Mexican economist who served as Secretary of Finance (1986–1988) in the last cabinet of Miguel de la Madrid and as Mexican ambassador to the United States (January 1989 – 1993).

Biography

Petricioli was the son of Carlos Petricioli Alarcón and Ada Iturbide Preciat. He received a high school diploma from the Monterrey Institute of Technology (ITESM), a bachelor's degree in Economics from the ITAM (1952) and a master's degree in the same discipline from Yale University (1958). He lectured on Monetary Theory at both ITAM and the National Autonomous University of Mexico (UNAM), and joined the Revolutionary Institutional Party (PRI) in 1952.

Before joining the federal cabinet Petricioli served as undersecretary of Finance (1970–74), as deputy director of the Bank of Mexico (1975–1976), and as director-general of Nacional Financiera (1982–1986). As secretary of Finance, he co-authored the Pact for Stability and Economic Growth (in ), a national strategy to control the fiscal deficit and inflation in coordination with the private sector.

Petricioli died of a heart attack on 9 October 1998 at Los Angeles Hospital, in Mexico City. He married Rosa Blanca Morales Murphy and they had two children: Gustavo and Ada. After their divorce, he remarried to Maria Luisa Castellón, mother of his next two children Hugo and Maria Luisa. Maria Luisa has two children now; Luisa and Mateo. In his honor, a remembrance book, was published by Editorial Porrúa and a statue was erected at ITAM; his alma mater.

References

Mexican Secretaries of Finance
Ambassadors of Mexico to the United States
Yale University alumni
Instituto Tecnológico Autónomo de México alumni
Monterrey Institute of Technology and Higher Education alumni
Academic staff of the National Autonomous University of Mexico
Politicians from Mexico City
1928 births
1998 deaths